Hans Gruhne (born 5 August 1988) is a German rower.  He won gold as part of the German team in the men's quadruple sculls at the 2016 Rio Olympics. He finished 6th in the men's quadruple sculls at the 2008 Summer Olympics.

References

External links
 
 
 
 
 
 

Olympic rowers of Germany
Rowers at the 2008 Summer Olympics
Rowers at the 2016 Summer Olympics
Rowers at the 2020 Summer Olympics
Rowers from Berlin
1988 births
Living people
German male rowers
World Rowing Championships medalists for Germany
Olympic gold medalists for Germany
Olympic medalists in rowing
Medalists at the 2016 Summer Olympics
European Rowing Championships medalists
21st-century German people